Ntando Duma (born August 29, 1995) is a South African actress and television personality. She is best known as a presenter on e.tv's youth programming block Craz-e, where she primarily featured on Craz-e World live. She is also well known for her portrayal of Zinzi Dandala on e.tv's soap opera Rhythm City. 

She is also embroiled in a race-row following a live stream where she racially abuses a woman who confronted her about parking in a disabled parking.

Early life 
Ntando Duma was born in the township of Orange Farm in Johannesburg, Gauteng. She grew up in the township of Orange Farm located approximately 45 km from Johannesburg, where she was raised by her mother and her grandmother. She has three siblings including her sister, Thando Duma.

Her father left the family when she was three years old and died in 2008.

Personal life 
She has a child with a DJ called Junior DeRocka who named their child, Sbahle Mzizi.

Career

Television
She joined the etv's Rhythm City as Zinzi Dandala. In June 2014 Ntando Duma was introduced as one of the new Craz-e presenters.

In 2020, she joined The Queen telenova playing  the role of Mpho Sebata , following  year in June 2021 was announced 
that she is leaving the production.

Modelling
She worked as a model and was part of 2015 Soweto fashion week runway.

Community
She founded the Inspire A Teen SA Foundation.

Copyright Infringement 

In January 2022 News24 reported that celebrity photographic agency Pixel Kollective notified her of copyright infringement after she posted photos taken by the on her social media account.

Controversy

References

1995 births
Living people
People from Orange Farm
People from Gauteng
South African female models
South African actresses